Build the Earth (BTE) is a project dedicated to creating a 1:1 scale model of Earth within the sandbox video game Minecraft.

History 

Build The Earth was created by YouTuber PippenFTS in March 2020 as a collaborative effort to recreate Earth in the video game Minecraft. In a YouTube video, PippenFTS  called for prospective participants to recreate man-made structures over a rudimentary model of Earth's terrain. A Discord server created to help coordinate the project attracted over a hundred thousand users by April 2020.

Minecraft developer Mojang Studios featured the project on their website on Earth Day 2020. In July 2020, YouTuber MrBeast released a video where he and 50 other people built his hometown of Raleigh, North Carolina within the project.

Software 
The Build The Earth project primarily depends on two Minecraft modifications to function: Cubic Chunks and Terra++. Cubic Chunks removes Minecrafts limitation on building structures beyond a certain height. Terra++ uses information from geographic data services, such as OpenStreetMap, to automatically generate terrain to ease the building process. The project originally used the Terra 1-to-1 mod instead of Terra++. PippenFTS stated that "with the Cubic Chunks mod breaking Minecraft's vertical limitations, we can now experience the Earth in Minecraft, just as it is, with no downscaling of any kind."

References

External links 

Minecraft servers
2020 works
Internet properties established in 2020